Dixson Island is a high ice-covered island,  long and  wide, at the west side of the mouth of Ninnis Glacier. It was discovered by the Australasian Antarctic Expedition (1911–14) under Douglas Mawson, who named it for Sir Hugh Dixson of Sydney, a patron of the expedition.

The northern point of Dixson Island is Cape Pollock.

See also 
 List of Antarctic and sub-Antarctic islands

References 

Islands of George V Land